Human Conditions is the second album by English singer-songwriter, Richard Ashcroft. It was released on Hut Records in 2002.

Release and reception
Review aggregating website Metacritic reports a normalised score of 61 based on 15 reviews, which indicated a "generally favourable" reception. However, many of the critics had negative views of Ashcroft's ideas. Some of the negative reviews, included Nick Southall of Stylus, who remarked that "Ashcroft obviously sees himself as some kind of incisive commentator with a greater depth of understanding of the human condition than those around him. This record reveals with alarming clarity that he is actually a poor songwriter, dire lyricist, and arrogant buffoon all at the same time." Andrew Lynch of entertainment.ie gave the album two stars out of five, calling it "in the final analysis, quite unbelievably boring." Rowan Shaeffer of Counterculture gave it three stars out of five and praised aspects of the album, though still feeling that "for the most part Richard Ashcroft seems be going through the motions; and while he's produced a good album, it's an ultimately unfulfilling listen."

Details
In 2003, when asked about the naysayers to the album, Ashcroft responded: "If I had put on fifteen stone and Kate had left me and I’d almost [overdosed] on smack, then this record would have been received very well".

Track listing
All tracks composed by Richard Ashcroft
"Check the Meaning" – 8:04
"Buy It in Bottles" – 4:39
"Bright Lights" – 5:15
"Paradise" – 5:37
"God in the Numbers" – 6:58
"Science of Silence" – 4:15
"Man on a Mission" – 5:29
"Running Away" – 4:16
"Lord I've Been Trying" – 5:23
"Nature Is the Law" – 4:55

Bonus track
The Japanese and American editions of the album featured one bonus track originally released as a B-side for the UK single "Check the Meaning".
"The Miracle" – 3:51

Personnel
Richard Ashcroft – vocals, guitar, percussion, bass, piano, Wurlitzer, keyboards
Peter Salisbury – drums
Kate Radley – keyboards
Martyn Campbell – bass
Talvin Singh – tablas, beats, drones, shruti box, duggi tarang, m adal
Chuck Leavell – piano, Hammond organ
Richard Robson – programming
Steve Sidelnyk – drum programming, programming
Craig Wagstaff – percussion
Jim Hunt – flute, saxophone
Matt Clifford – Wurlitzer
Brian Wilson – backing vocals, backing vocal arrangement
Wil Malone – orchestral arrangements, conducting
The London Session Orchestra – strings
London Community Gospel Choir – choir

Release details

References

External links
Richard Ashcroft: Human Conditions (2003): Reviews at Metacritic.
[ Billboard.com – Discography – Richard Ashcroft – Human Conditions] at Billboard.com

Richard Ashcroft albums
2002 albums
Albums produced by Chris Potter (record producer)
Hut Records albums
Virgin Records albums